MKE could refer to:

 Milwaukee, Wisconsin
 Milwaukee Mitchell International Airport in Milwaukee, Wisconsin; IATA airport code MKE.
 Mechanical and Chemical Industry Corporation (Turkey), in Turkish, Makina ve Kimya Endustrisi Kurumu
 Milwaukee Intermodal Station; Amtrak station code MKE.
 MKE (tabloid), a weekly publication in Milwaukee which ended in 2008.
 MKE Ankaragücü, a Turkish football club in Ankara
 MKE Kırıkkalespor, a Turkish football club in Kirikkale
 MSDW Structured Asset Corporation, New York Stock Exchange symbol MKE.
 Matsushita Kotobuki Electronics, referring to the obsolete Panasonic CD interface also known as SLCD.
 Ministry of Knowledge Economy (MKE), now the Ministry of Trade, Industry and Energy (MOTIE)